Alphonsus Edward "Phonse" Kyne (29 October 1915 – 8 April 1985) was an Australian rules footballer who played for and coached Collingwood in the Victorian Football League. He is an inductee of the Australian Football Hall of Fame and a member of the official Collingwood Team of the Century. Along with Allan La Fontaine (Melbourne Football Club), he is widely regarded as one of the two best footballers to graduate from St Kevin's College, Toorak.

A centre half-forward and ruckman during his playing career, Kyne was a member of Collingwood premiership sides in 1935 and 1936.

He won his first best and fairest in 1946, winning the award again the following two seasons to become the first player to win the Copeland Trophy three years in succession. Kyne had his first stint as captain in 1942 before getting the role permanently from 1946 to 1949. He had served in the Australian Army (22nd Battalion) between 1942 and 1945.

A regular Victorian interstate representative, Kyne played a total of 11 games for the state and captaining them at the 1947 Hobart Carnival.

In 1950 Kyne was appointed coach of Collingwood and took the field seven times that season before becoming a non-playing coach from 1951 onwards. His 272 games as coach is the second most by a Collingwood player and he was a premiership winning coach in 1953 and 1958.

Collingwood historian Michael Roberts speculated that Kyne is one of three Collingwood footballers depicted in John Brack's 1953 painting Three of the Players.

Footnotes

References 
 
 Barr, Andrew, "Magpies' Phonse Kyne dies at 69", The Age, (Tuesday, 9 April 1985), p.40.

External links 

 

 Coaching record

1915 births
1985 deaths
Collingwood Football Club coaches
Collingwood Football Club Premiership coaches
Collingwood Football Club players
Collingwood Football Club Premiership players
Copeland Trophy winners
Australian rules footballers from Victoria (Australia)
Australian Football Hall of Fame inductees
People educated at St Kevin's College, Melbourne
Two-time VFL/AFL Premiership players
Two-time VFL/AFL Premiership coaches